Robert Hill is an American writer, notable for his collaborations with Albert Zugsmith.

Select filmography
Arctic Flight (1952)
Stolen Identity (1952)
Female on the Beach (1955) - plus author of original play The Besieged Heart
Raw Edge (1956)
The Beast of Hollow Mountain (1956)
A Woman's Devotion (1956)
The Girl in the Kremlin (1957)
The Female Animal (1958)
She Gods of Shark Reef (1958)
Tarzan, the Ape Man (1959)
The Private Lives of Adam and Eve (1960)
Sex Kittens Go to College (1960)
Confessions of an Opium Eater (1962)
Dog Eat Dog (1964)
Fanny Hill: Memoirs of a Woman of Pleasure (1965)

External links

Possibly living people
Year of birth missing
American screenwriters